Trbovlje is Slovenia's tenth-largest town, and the seat of the Municipality of Trbovlje. It is located in the valley of a minor left bank tributary of the Sava River in the Central Sava Valley in central-eastern Slovenia.

Name
Trbovlje was attested in written sources in 1220–30 as Trefeul (and as Trevůl and Trevol in 1265–67, Triuella in 1302, Trifeul in 1325, Triueal in 1330, and Triuel in 1424). The name is a feminine plural noun in standard Slovene, but in the local dialect it is declined as a neuter singular adjective. This indicates that the name is derived from *Trěbovľe selo (literally, 'Trěbo's village'), referring to an early inhabitant of the place. In the past the German name was Trifail.

History
Coal mining began at Beech Mountain south of the town in 1804. The town was connected to the Austrian Southern Railway in 1849, which contributed to its further development. During the 19th century, a cement plant, mechanical separator, sawmill, and power plant were built in Trbovlje.

Poor social conditions in Trbovlje led to several strikes by mine workers, and the town became a center of the leftist movement and communist agitation. On June 1, 1924 there was a clash between workers and members of the Organization of Yugoslav Nationalists that resulted in several fatalities on both sides. In 1934, miners staged a sitdown strike at the mine.

Second World War
During the Second World War, Trbovlje, along with the rest of Lower Styria, was annexed to the Third Reich. The coal mine and other industries of Trbovlje were especially important to the German authorities, and they initially lowered unemployment in the town and increased wages, increasing satisfaction with the new regime. However, the arrest and exile of Slovenes in August 1941 created disaffection. This and other repressive measures resulted in an estimated 90% of the population opposing the Germans by the summer of 1944.

Mass grave

The Abandoned Cemetery Mass Grave site, associated with World War II, is located in the former cemetery in the northern part of the town, between the fence and Trboveljščica Creek. It is also known as the Town Park Mass Grave, and it contains the remains of about 30 German soldiers.

Culture
The Trbovlje Museum has a large section dedicated to the history of mining. 

The Slovenian industrial band Laibach also originated in Trbovlje.

The Trbovlje Student Club organization holds various events.

Economy
Trbovlje is known for its long coal mining history. Trbovlje is also known for Trbovlje Power Station, which is the location of European Union's tallest chimney at 360 meters. In the past there were companies like respected Strojna Tovarna Trbovlje - STT, well known Iskra, Mehanika, Cementarna Trbovlje, et cetera that have employed many high skilled people and contributed to the economy. Due to their size this was not felt only locally but nationally.

Parishes and churches
Two Roman Catholic parishes have their seat in Trbovlje: the Parish of Trbovlje–St. Martin and the Parish of Trbovlje–St. Mary. Both belong to the Diocese of Celje.

The Parish Church of St Martin was originally a Romanesque church, of which part of the nave survives. The sanctuary is Gothic and in the 18th century a Baroque belfry and chapel were added. In the 19th century the nave was extended. A second church of the Parish of Trbovlje–St. Martin in the western end of town is dedicated to Saint Nicholas and was built in the 18th century.

The Parish of Trbovlje–St Mary in the southern part of the town was established in 2000. Its parish church is dedicated to the Virgin Mary, Mother of the Church. It was built from 1998 to 2000 according to plans by the architect Jože Marinko. Stained glasses, paintings, and the Stations of the Cross were created by the academy-trained painter Lojze Čemažar. The church was blessed in August 2000 and consecrated in October 2007.

A significant portion of Trbovlje's populace today describe themselves as atheists, in third place behind Catholic and "no response."

Twin places
 Sallaumines, northern France since 1964. There is a street in Sallaumines named Trbovlje, and a street in Trbovlje named Sallaumines. There are also regular short-term exchanges of schoolchildren.

References

External links

Official site (Trbovlje.si)
Trbovlje on Geopedia.si (map, aerial photograph)
Trbovlje on Google Maps (map, photographs, street view)

 
Populated places in the Municipality of Trbovlje
Cities and towns in Styria (Slovenia)